Morley is a civil parish in the metropolitan borough of the City of Leeds, West Yorkshire, England.  The parish contains 56 listed buildings that are recorded in the National Heritage List for England.  Of these, one is listed at Grade I, the highest of the three grades, and the others are at Grade II, the lowest grade.  The parish contains the town of Morley and the surrounding area.  Most of the listed buildings are houses, cottages, and associated structures.  The other listed buildings include churches, church halls, memorials in the churchyards, including a mausoleum, former mill buildings, Sunday schools, milestones, railway bridges, a former poor house, banks, a public library, a town hall, and a war memorial.


Key

Buildings

References

Citations

Sources

} 

Lists of listed buildings in West Yorkshire
Listed